Nkau Lerotholi (born 27 September 1990) is a Mosotho footballer who plays as a centre-back for Matlama. He has won seven caps for the Lesotho national football team since 2000.

In summer 2011 Lerotholi was along Thapelo Tale on trial with Serbian SuperLiga club FK Jagodina.

International career

International goals
Scores and results list Lesotho's goal tally first.

References

External links
 

1990 births
Living people
People from Maseru District
Lesotho footballers
Association football defenders
Lesotho international footballers
Matlama FC players